Garrett M. Brown (born November 7, 1948) is an American character actor.

Early life
Brown was born in Michigan but grew up in Connecticut. In 1972, he moved to New York City, where he worked as an orderly in a nursing home and as a waiter before starting acting classes.

Career 
He is known for portraying Bob Russell in Uncle Buck (1989) and James Lizewski in Kick-Ass (2010) and Kick-Ass 2 (2013). He also played the titular lead role in Hello, My Name Is Frank (2014), for which he won the Best Actor Award at the Manhattan Film Festival.

Filmography

Film

Television

References

External links
 
 

1948 births
American male actors
living people